Kings Creek is an  tributary of Elk Creek in Sullivan County, Pennsylvania, in the United States.

Kings Creek joins Elk Creek at the community of Lincoln Falls.

See also
 List of rivers of Pennsylvania

References

Rivers of Pennsylvania
Rivers of Sullivan County, Pennsylvania
Tributaries of Loyalsock Creek